Marek Wrona (born 31 August 1966) is a Polish former racing cyclist. He won the Tour de Pologne 1989.

References

External links

1966 births
Living people
Polish male cyclists
People from Oława
Sportspeople from Lower Silesian Voivodeship